This is a list of 161 species in Mesoleius, a genus of ichneumon wasps in the family Ichneumonidae.

Mesoleius species

 Mesoleius abbreviatus Brischke, 1871 c g
 Mesoleius abdominalis Brischke, 1871 c g
 Mesoleius aceris Kasparyan & Shaw, 2003 c g
 Mesoleius admirabilis Kasparyan, 2000 c g
 Mesoleius affinis Brischke, 1892 c g
 Mesoleius agilis Brischke, 1871 c g
 Mesoleius albopictus Brischke, 1892 c g
 Mesoleius albotibialis Strobl, 1903 c g
 Mesoleius alekhinoi Kasparyan, 2000 c g
 Mesoleius altalpinus Bauer, 1985 c g
 Mesoleius altissimus Bauer, 1985 c g
 Mesoleius analis Brischke, 1878 c g
 Mesoleius annulatus Brischke, 1871 c
 Mesoleius ardonator Kasparyan, 2000 c g
 Mesoleius arduus Kasparyan, 2000 c g
 Mesoleius armillatorius (Gravenhorst, 1807) c g
 Mesoleius articularis Davis, 1897 c g
 Mesoleius assiduus Holmgren, 1876 c g
 Mesoleius ater Kasparyan, 2001 c g
 Mesoleius atratus Kasparyan, 2000 c g
 Mesoleius audax Davis, 1897 c g
 Mesoleius aulicus (Gravenhorst, 1829) c g
 Mesoleius axillaris (Stephens, 1835) c g
 Mesoleius balearicus (Kriechbaumer, 1894) c g
 Mesoleius bipunctatus Brischke, 1871 c g
 Mesoleius bisignatus Costa, 1888 c g
 Mesoleius brachyacanthus Parfitt, 1881 c g
 Mesoleius breviformis Teunissen, 1945 c g
 Mesoleius brevipalpis Thomson, 1894 c g
 Mesoleius brevis Brischke, 1871 c g
 Mesoleius caninae Bridgman, 1886 c g
 Mesoleius castaneus Habermehl, 1925 c
 Mesoleius chicoutimiensis Provancher, 1888 c g
 Mesoleius cingulatus Brischke, 1871 c g
 Mesoleius clypearis Brischke, 1878 c g
 Mesoleius clypeator Kasparyan, 2000 c g
 Mesoleius cognatus Brischke, 1871 c g
 Mesoleius comeaui Townes, 1945 c g
 Mesoleius conformus Davis, 1897 c g
 Mesoleius contractus Holmgren, 1857 c g
 Mesoleius coriaceus Holmgren, 1857 c g
 Mesoleius cressoni (Davis, 1897) c g
 Mesoleius dubitator Kasparyan, 2000 c g
 Mesoleius dubius Holmgren, 1857 c g
 Mesoleius dudinka Kasparyan, 2001 c g
 Mesoleius dumeticola Teunissen, 1945 c g
 Mesoleius efferus Holmgren, 1876 c g
 Mesoleius ephippium Tschek, 1869 c g
 Mesoleius euphrosyne Teunissen, 1953 c g
 Mesoleius excavatus (Provancher, 1875) c
 Mesoleius exsculptus Brischke, 1871 c g
 Mesoleius facialis Brischke, 1878 c g
 Mesoleius faciator Kasparyan, 2001 c g
 Mesoleius filicornis Holmgren, 1876 c g
 Mesoleius flavipes Brischke, 1871 c g
 Mesoleius flavoguttatus (Gravenhorst, 1829) c
 Mesoleius flavopictus (Gravenhorst, 1829) g
 Mesoleius frenalis Thomson, 1894 c g
 Mesoleius frigidor Kasparyan, 2001 c g
 Mesoleius frigidus Holmgren, 1857 c
 Mesoleius frontatus Thomson, 1894 c g
 Mesoleius fulvator Kasparyan, 2000 c g
 Mesoleius furax Holmgren, 1857 g
 Mesoleius fuscipes Holmgren, 1857 c g
 Mesoleius fuscotrochanteratus Strobl, 1903 c g
 Mesoleius gelidor Kasparyan, 2000 c g
 Mesoleius geniculatus Holmgren, 1857 c g
 Mesoleius granulosus Kasparyan, 2000 c g
 Mesoleius groenlandicus Roman, 1930 c g
 Mesoleius grossulariae (Ratzeburg, 1852) c g
 Mesoleius hamulator Kasparyan, 2000 c g
 Mesoleius hirtus Rudow, 1882 c g
 Mesoleius hypoleucus Teunissen, 1945 c g
 Mesoleius implicator Kasparyan, 2000 c g
 Mesoleius incisus Thomson, 1894 c g
 Mesoleius infuscator Kasparyan, 2000 c g
 Mesoleius insidiosus (Cresson, 1868) c g
 Mesoleius insularis Roman, 1924 c g
 Mesoleius integrator (Müller, 1776) c g
 Mesoleius intermedius (Gravenhorst, 1829) c g
 Mesoleius irkutensis Kasparyan, 2000 c g
 Mesoleius juvenilis Holmgren, 1857 c g
 Mesoleius khasura Kasparyan, 2000 c g
 Mesoleius kiruna Kasparyan, 2000 c g
 Mesoleius kola Kasparyan, 2000 c g
 Mesoleius lapponator Kasparyan, 2000 c g
 Mesoleius laricis Teunissen, 1953 c g
 Mesoleius latipes Brischke, 1871 c g
 Mesoleius lautaretor Kasparyan, 2000 c g
 Mesoleius leucomelas Habermehl, 1903 c g
 Mesoleius lindemansi Teunissen, 1953 c g
 Mesoleius londoko Kasparyan, 2000 c g
 Mesoleius lunaris Brischke, 1871 c g
 Mesoleius maculator Kasparyan, 2001 c g
 Mesoleius maculatus Brischke, 1871 c g
 Mesoleius melanius Roman, 1909 c g
 Mesoleius melanoleucus (Gravenhorst, 1829) c g
 Mesoleius melanurus Constantineanu, 1973 c g
 Mesoleius mica Kasparyan, 2001 c g
 Mesoleius minor (Ashmead, 1902) c g
 Mesoleius mollator Kasparyan, 2000 c g
 Mesoleius montegratus Bauer, 1985 c g
 Mesoleius nigrans Kasparyan, 2001 c g
 Mesoleius nigromica Kasparyan, 2001 c g
 Mesoleius nigropalpis Brischke, 1871 c g
 Mesoleius nimis Heinrich, 1950 c g
 Mesoleius nivalis Holmgren, 1857 c g
 Mesoleius notator Kasparyan, 2001 c g
 Mesoleius obliquus Thomson, 1894 c g
 Mesoleius obtusator Kasparyan, 2001 c g
 Mesoleius omolon Kasparyan, 2001 c g
 Mesoleius opticus (Gravenhorst, 1829) c g
 Mesoleius palmeni Woldstedt, 1874 c g
 Mesoleius parumpictus Roman, 1909 g
 Mesoleius parvus Holmgren, 1857 c g
 Mesoleius perbellus Teunissen, 1945 c g
 Mesoleius peronatus (Marshall, 1876) c g
 Mesoleius pertaesor Kasparyan, 2001 c g
 Mesoleius pertinax Davis, 1897 c g
 Mesoleius phyllotomae Cushman, 1933 c g
 Mesoleius picticoxa Thomson, 1894 c g
 Mesoleius pictus Brischke, 1871 c g
 Mesoleius placidus Holmgren, 1857 c g
 Mesoleius pulchranotus Davis, 1897 c g
 Mesoleius pusio Holmgren, 1857 c g
 Mesoleius pyriformis (Ratzeburg, 1852) c
 Mesoleius robustus (Provancher, 1883) c g
 Mesoleius roepkei Teunissen, 1945 c g
 Mesoleius rufopectus (Provancher, 1888) c
 Mesoleius rugipleuris Heinrich, 1952 c g
 Mesoleius saami Kasparyan, 2001 c g
 Mesoleius scutellaris Rudow, 1886 c g
 Mesoleius seida Kasparyan, 2000 c g
 Mesoleius sobicola Kasparyan, 2001 c g
 Mesoleius spoliatus Teunissen, 1945 c g
 Mesoleius stejnegeri Ashmead, 1899 c g
 Mesoleius stenostigma Thomson, 1894 c g
 Mesoleius strobli Habermehl, 1925 c g
 Mesoleius styriacus Heinrich, 1953 c g
 Mesoleius subcoriaceus Strobl, 1903 c g
 Mesoleius submarginatus (Cresson, 1864) c g
 Mesoleius subroseus Thomson, 1888 c g
 Mesoleius tarsalis (Cresson, 1868) c
 Mesoleius tasarensis Kasparyan, 2001 c g
 Mesoleius tegulator Kasparyan, 2001 c g
 Mesoleius tenthredinis Morley, 1912 c g b
 Mesoleius terpeji Kasparyan, 2001 c g
 Mesoleius thuringiacus Habermehl, 1925 c g
 Mesoleius tibialis Holmgren, 1857 c g
 Mesoleius tibiator Kasparyan, 2000 c g
 Mesoleius tinctor Kasparyan, 2001 c g
 Mesoleius titarensis Kasparyan, 2001 c g
 Mesoleius tixi Kasparyan, 2001 c g
 Mesoleius tolmachevi Kasparyan, 2001 c g
 Mesoleius tornei Kasparyan, 2001 c g
 Mesoleius torpescor Kasparyan, 2001 c g
 Mesoleius tricoloripes Costa, 1886 c g
 Mesoleius trochanteratus Brischke, 1871 c g
 Mesoleius urbanus Teunissen, 1945 c g
 Mesoleius ussuriensis Kasparyan, 2000 c g
 Mesoleius varicoxa Thomson, 1894 c g

Data sources: i = ITIS, c = Catalogue of Life, g = GBIF, b = Bugguide.net

References

Mesoleius